Charles Richard Lord (April 4, 1931 – February 8, 1993) was an American intelligence official who was Deputy Director of the National Security Agency from 1986 to 1988 during which time he was the highest ranking civilian in the agency.

Biography
He was an alumnus of the University of Michigan, Denison University, the National War College and Army Language School. He joined the NSA in 1958 as a cryptologist. With the NSA he also served in the capacities of Chief in Europe and as Chief of Staff and Deputy Director for Operations. He was a recipient of the Presidential Distinguished Executive Award and Department of Defense and National Intelligence Distinguished Service awards.

In 1987, he assumed the vice presidency of E-Systems, a major contractor of the NSA. He served in that position until his death from a cerebral hemorrhage in 1993.

References

1931 births
1993 deaths
University of Michigan alumni
Deputy Directors of the National Security Agency
People from Omaha, Nebraska